Tono Stano (born 24 March 1960) is a Slovakia-born art photographer living and working in Prague, Czech Republic.

Life and work
Stano was born in Zlaté Moravce, now Slovakia.

He attended the secondary school of applied arts in Bratislava from 1975 to 1979, and then, from 1980 to 1986, the FAMU in Prague (School of Film, Photography, and Television). Still during their studies, he and his fellow students (e.g. Miro Svolik) at FAMU developed a new style of staged photography, full of expressive movements and metaphor, partly influenced by performance art. 

Stano is mainly known for his black-and-white photographs of the female body. Several of his photographs have been used for the cover of photography books. The picture "Sense", for example, appeared on the cover of the photography book The Body by William A. Ewing.

Solo exhibitions

Fotochema, Prague, 1986
Galerie G4, Cheb, 1989
Le Pont Neuf, Paris, 1990
Galerie U Recickych, Prague, 1992
Palac Metro, Prague, 1992
Narodni technicke Museum, Prague 1995
Galerie Marzee, Nijmegen, The Netherlands, 1996
Dom kultury, Bratislava, 1996
Schoren, St. Gallen, Switzerland 2000
Prazsky dum fotografie, Prague, 2001
Slovak Institute and Czech Centre, Berlin, 2002
Galerie Baudelaire, Antwerp, 2004
Institut Français, Budapest, 2004

Publications

References

External links
 
 Photography book "Praha" by Tono Stano

1960 births
Living people
Photographers from Prague
Slovak photographers
Academy of Performing Arts in Prague alumni
People from Zlaté Moravce